Col. Geraldine Pratt May (April 21, 1895-November 2, 1997) was the first director of Women in the Air Force (WAF) and the first woman colonel in the United States Air Force.

Military career 
May joined the Women’s Army Auxiliary Corps (WAAC) in July 1942. She was promoted to staff director of WAAC’s Air Transport Command in March 1943.

In 1948, May became the first director of the newly created Women in the Air Force (WAF) and was promoted to the rank of colonel making her the first woman colonel in the United States Air Force. 

May received the Legion of Merit for her service during World War II.

Death and legacy 
May died in Menlo Park, California at the age of 102. She is interred at Arlington National Cemetery.

References 

1895 births
1997 deaths
Burials at Arlington National Cemetery
United States Air Force colonels